Pterolophia inaequalis is a species of beetle in the family Cerambycidae. It was described by Johan Christian Fabricius in 1801. It is known from India.

References

inalbonotata
Beetles described in 1801